Port Granby is a dispersed rural community in the municipality of Clarington, Regional Municipality of Durham in Ontario, Canada.

History
The area was first settled in the summer of 1796, and Danforth's Road — from Toronto to the mouth of the Trent River, later extended via Prince Edward County to connect onward to Kingston — was completed through the area by Asa Danforth Jr. by 1799, but that route was superseded by Kingston Road further north, away from the Port Granby area, in 1817. The community is first mentioned as the Village of Granby in 1841. A request to incorporate the Granby Harbor Company was made in 1846, and the community was officially named Port Granby in 1848. Grain and timber were the principal goods shipped from the port through the 19th century, but the village had mostly disappeared by the 1920s, with only a few homes and a post office remaining in 1936.

References

Neighbourhoods in Clarington